MASH is a multiplayer paper-and-pencil game commonly played by children intended to predict one's future. The name is an acronym of "Mansion, Apartment, Shack/Street/Shed/Sewers/Swamp, and House". The game can be expanded or changed to "DMASH" (the "D" standing for "dome"), "MASHO" (the "O" standing for "outhouse"), "MASH-IT" (the "I" standing for "igloo" and the "T" standing for "tent"), "SMASH" (the "S" standing for "school bus"), "RAP MASH" (the "R" standing for "rich," the "A" standing for "average," and the "P" standing for "poor"), "MASH-N" (the "N" standing for "no house"), "CASH" (the "C" standing for "chateau" or "castle"), "PASH" (the "P" standing for "palace" or "penthouse"), or "BASH" (the "B" standing for "box"). 
Additional variations include adding a potential car, future spouse, and ultimate career choice, among the numerous other possible categories.

Game play for MASH
 The game starts by either player writing out the title MASH at the top of a piece of paper.
 Both players contribute to writing a list of categories like where you live, how many kids you have, who you marry, and what your job is.
 Each player thinks of 3 answers for each category: 2 they want and 1 they don't, and writes them in a column under the category title.
 Player 2 then begins to draw a swirl on a separate piece of paper. Player 1 says "Stop" at a time they choose after waiting at least 3 seconds, and player 2 stops and draws a line through the swirl from the endpoint to the starting point. They then count how many times the swirl intercepts the line drawn.
 Alternatively, player 2 will make tally marks instead of drawing a swirl. When player 1 says 'Stop', player 2 stops drawing marks and counts them.
 Player 1 or 2 counts each item down the page (starting with the MASH), and crosses off the answer that they land on. For instance, if four lines were counted in the swirl, every fourth answer is crossed off the list. This continues until there is only one item in each category. Each letter in the title is considered an answer and should be crossed off accordingly.
 The remaining items are considered to determine the Player 1's future while the crossed-out ones will be Player 2's future.
Example: You live in a mansion with Kenton. You will be a photographer with 16 kids, 1 boy and 15 girls. You will live in Denver.

References

External links

How to Play MASH - alternative instructions

Children's games
Paper-and-pencil games